Joshua Edwards is a Scottish footballer who plays as a defender for Dunfermline Athletic. Edwards began his career with Airdrieonians.

Career
Edwards started his career with Kilmarnock, Ayr United and Ayrshire boys’ club Crosshouse Community, before joining Scottish League One side Airdrieonians in 2017. He made his first-team debut in a league victory over Forfar Athletic in December 2017.

After attracting interest from a number of clubs, Edwards signed a two-year deal with Scottish Championship side Dunfermline Athletic for an undisclosed fee on 16 July 2019. The following day, Edwards made his first appearance for Dunfermline, coming on as a second-half substitute in a Scottish League Cup match against Albion Rovers.

Career statistics

References

External links

2000 births
Living people
Scottish footballers
Association football defenders
Airdrieonians F.C. players
Dunfermline Athletic F.C. players
Scottish Professional Football League players